Taha Kemara is a New Zealand rugby union player who plays for the  in Super Rugby. His playing position is fly-half. He was named in the Crusaders squad for the 2023 Super Rugby Pacific season. He was also a member of the  2022 Bunnings NPC squad.

Having begun playing rugby at Te Awamutu Sports Rugby Club, Kemara attended Hamilton Boys' High School, where he captained them to their first High School title since 2006, playing alongside new Crusaders teammate Noah Hotham.

References

External links

New Zealand rugby union players
Living people
Rugby union fly-halves
Waikato rugby union players
Crusaders (rugby union) players
Year of birth missing (living people)